I Am Chicago is a documentary photography and video project by Adam Novak and Sara Collins. It consists of full body portraits and video footage of pedestrians in thirty neighborhoods across Chicago, spanning the years of 2009–2011. It became a gallery of photographs and a website, showing the tremendous richness of the way that Chicagoans present themselves to the public. The gallery shows the faces, bodies, attitudes, clothes, accessories and tools of everyday life that people lug with them, morphing wildly from North to South, and East to West of Chicago. 

The photographers used a rental moving truck as a portrait studio, utilizing natural light from the translucent roof of the truck. Each neighborhood of Chicago is represented through a careful selection of portraits of its citizens as they passed the street corner studio in the course of a single day. To entice Chicagoans to pose, a professional studio portrait was printed on the spot and given to each participant for free.

The project attracted the attention of the Chicago Reader in early 2011, when NBC 5 Chicago used the words "We Are Chicago" for their advertising campaign.   

NBC 5 Chicago

Notes

External links
I Am Chicago

Photography exhibitions
Documentary films about Chicago